Turner Chapel was an African Methodist Episcopalian Church located at 37 Lakeshore Road West in Oakville, Ontario, Canada. It was established in 1890. An earlier structure, built on the east side of Sixteen Mile Creek, had burned down. The west side of the river, where artisans lived, was a more welcoming environment for Oakville's "Black Church". It is telling that the church was named after Bishop Henry McNeal Turner, as he was an advocate of the back-to-Africa movement, and the first black chaplain, appointed by Abraham Lincoln, during the American Civil War.

The escaped slaves were seeking to escape the penalties of the fugitive slave laws which were passed in the United States in the early nineteenth century. Many of the escapees were skilled tradesmen and one of their number developed the technology that made "stoneboating" possible. Stoneboating was a system where ships could grapple for slabs of sedimentary rock which could then be cut and prepared for building materials. The stratification of the rock, a natural process over eons of time, made for regularly shaped "brick-like" material which had the virtue of being easy to form and consistent in shape. In fact, it was an ideal supply for local stonemasons.

It would be an error to think of the newcomers as indigent. Through their intelligence and their craftsmanship they began to have sufficient capital to invest in homes, farms, and a place of worship that was distinctly their own. Rather than copy the places of worship they had known in the southern states they were impressed by the churches of east Oakville. That's likely why they chose red brick for the structure complete with "flying buttresses" which, in essence, are strictly ornamental rather than functional. The floor area of the church is little over 1000 square feet and it was built on sand. This method of building had the virtue of providing complete drainage and keeping the structure free of moisture and the possibility of mold.

Oakville Heritage Society plaque 

Outside the present day building there is a sign erected by the Oakville Historic Society. It reads:

Later years 

Turner Chapel served as a community centre for the Afro American immigrants as well as a place of worship. Gradually, however, the members of the congregation began to disperse to other communities and in the later years of the twentieth century the property was leased to an offshoot of the Anglican Church with a small congregation of twelve members and a bishop. The Anglicans sought funding for renovations and the church, which was in danger of toppling because a weakened foundation, was repaired and outfitted with central heating and air conditioning. Money was also raised to replace the original windows with new stained glass and leaded panes.

In 2000 the owners of the Church placed the property on the market. The single lot housed both the church and the newer (1930's) manse. The site was ignored by developers because of the rigorous demands of the historic designation on the church. In effect, the church structure could not be modified or changed in any way. In 2002 Jed Gardner, a local antique dealer, decided to purchase both properties to be the location of his expanding business. Gardner worked with the Oakville Historical Society to accommodate the new purpose and the building was restored in a suitable manner and preserved for future generations to enjoy.

See also
 History of Methodism in the United States, including information about the foundation of the African Methodist Episcopalian Movement
 History of Black Canadians

External links

 Stephen Ward Angell, "Henry McNeal Turner (1834-1915)", New Georgia Encyclopedia
 Biography of bishop Henry McNeal Turner
 Oakville's Black History, on Canadian Caribbean Association of Halton
 References to Turner Chapel on Halinet
 Architectural Details of Turner Chapel, on Building Stories
 Historic Register of Turner Chapel AME Church
 The Black Experience in Oakville, Ontario
 The Underground Railroad and its connection to Oakville, Ontario
 Bishop Turner's famous speech: "God is a Negro".
 The Black Church: A Brief History

Chapels in Canada
Churches in Ontario
Buildings and structures in Oakville, Ontario